Bulbophyllum saltatorium (dancing bulbophyllum) is a species of orchid.

saltatorium